Steinmauern is a town in the district of Rastatt in Baden-Württemberg in Germany. It falls under the administrative jurisdiction of Karlsruhe.

Mayor
Siegfried Schaaf was the mayor from 1992 until 2020, he was re-elected in 2000, 2008 and 2016. Toni Hoffarth was elected mayor in 2020.

References

Rastatt (district)